Nicola Griffith (born 30 September 1960) is a British-American novelist, essayist, and teacher. She has won the Washington State Book Award, Nebula Award, James Tiptree, Jr. Award, World Fantasy Award and six Lambda Literary Awards.

Personal life

Early life 
Griffith was born 30 September 1960 in Leeds, to Margaret Mary and Eric Percival Griffith. Her parents—whom she describes as wanting "to belong to the middle of the middle class … to fit in" —reared Griffith and her four sisters in the Catholic faith.

Griffith's earliest surviving literary efforts include an illustrated booklet she was encouraged to create to prevent her from making trouble among her fellow nursery school students.  At age eleven she won a BBC student poetry prize and read aloud her winning work for radio broadcast.

As a pre-teen, Griffith felt same-sex attractions, and by sometime in her thirteenth year, she knew she "was a dyke." She also felt cautioned by her parents' punishing response after one of her sisters acted on such desires at age fifteen. Thus her conclusion that "no hint of how I felt must be allowed …. Not until I reached sixteen"  when she would no longer be a minor.

To cope with her sexuality and her family's disapproval, Griffith began to drink alcohol, smoke cigarettes, and immerse herself in reading and music. In addition to the classics of English literature, she read the works of such novelists as Henry Treece and Rosemary Sutcliff; fantastic fiction including the works of E.E. Smith, Frank Herbert, and J.R.R. Tolkien; nonfiction about life sciences and history—Gibbon's History of the Decline and Fall of the Roman Empire was a particular favorite; and such poetry as Homer's Iliad and John Masefield's Cargoes. Her musical choices included classical canon, traditional church compositions, and folk music offset by David Bowie and other glam rockers.

During this time, a visit to relatives in Glasgow, Scotland—in particular a behind-the-scenes tour of a power station, with its efficient water recycling system—left Griffith feeling "terribly alert." She paid more attention thereafter to the occasional school course that interested her—chemistry, physics, and biology especially—and at age fourteen, broadened her artistic tastes to encompass the works of William S. Burroughs, Led Zeppelin, and Pink Floyd. 

At fifteen, Griffith developed an attraction toward one of her friends, Una Fitzgerald, and once they were of age, they began dating; the relationship lasted two years. 

At this point, Griffith began an extended tour of Leeds' after-hours underbelly, even as her sister Helena developed a drug habit.  During this phase, Griffith met Carol Taylor, and the two became longtime partners. Griffith moved out of her parents' household in Leeds and relocated to Hull, where she and Taylor initially lived a marginal existence. Recreational drugs became Griffith's default setting. Nonetheless, she states that in Hull, "My real education began." 

Griffith got to know "feminists and intellectuals … bikers and drug dealers, and dykes pimping out their girlfriends." She found her first women's community there and read "earnest feminist fiction."

1980s 
In the early 1980s, Griffith founded and left the band Janes Plane and began writing seriously.

In 1984, she began studying the physical art of self-defense the next year and in August, smoked her last cigarette. The following month she gave up hashish and amphetamines.

Griffith suffered some personal setbacks that had roots in 1985. Helena had gone from addiction to dealing heroin and amphetamines. As the year ended, Griffith, already sick with influenza, was hurt and briefly hospitalised after helping another woman in a bar assault. Delayed reaction to the attack contributed to what she later characterised as PTSD in June 1986. Her writing and a women's self-defense course that she was teaching sustained her amid these difficulties, and Helena's counterexample helped persuade Griffith to abandon all recreational drug use, including magic mushrooms, which she had relied on extensively. 

By the late 1980s, Griffith had begun experiencing symptoms of multiple sclerosis (MS), though her illness remained undiagnosed.

1990s 
Griffith was diagnosed with multiple sclerosis in March 1993.

While studying at Michigan State University, Griffith met and fell in love with fellow writer Kelley Eskridge. On 4 September 1993, Griffith and Eskridge announced their commitment ceremony in The Atlanta Journal-Constitution, perhaps the first same-sex commitment announcement the paper had published.

Griffith wanted citizenship so she could remain in the country with her wife, but because she was a lesbian, she couldn't receive citizenship through marriage, and all other pathways were closed. She began working with an immigration lawyer who believed she may qualify for a National Interest Waiver on the basis of being an "alien of exceptional ability" if she could prove her worth as a writer. Even after winning the Lambda Literary Award for Lesbian Science Fiction/Fantasy and James Tiptree, Jr. Award, she was not considered exceptional enough. After reaching out to Allen Ginsberg, she received a letter from him stating, "Nicola Griffith is an astonishingly gifted writer. … Her work is of the very best in the lesbian and gay literary field. … In my opinion, it is in the national interest to grant her immigrant status in this country." After much effort, Griffith received permission to live and work in the United States based on her "importance as a writer of lesbian/science fiction," making her the first out lesbian to receive a National Interest Waiver. Her immigration resulted in a new law, and she is now a dual US/UK citizen.

In 1995, Griffith and Eskridge moved to Seattle, where they still live today.

2000s 
Griffith and Eskridge were legally married 4 September 2013.

Education 
As a child, Griffith attended the Notre Dame Grammar School, "a girls-only Catholic convent school." After graduation, she accepted an offer to attend the University of Leeds to study Microbiology, becoming the first person in her family to attend post-secondary education. However, she dropped out of the program shortly after courses began, and though she was accepted into a Bachelor of Science program in Psychology at another university, she did not have funding to attend.

Unsure what she wanted to do with her life, Griffith applied for two international programs in the late 1980s: one at a women's martial arts camp in the Netherlands, one at the Clarion Workshop at Michigan State University. 

Clarion accepted Griffith with a scholarship, so she began classes in 1988.

After speaking with Farah Mendlesohn, Griffith learned she could potentially earn a Doctor of Philosophy by Published Work in Creative Writing from Anglia Ruskin University. After completing her thesis, entitled "Norming the Queer: Narrative Empathy via Focalized Heterotopia," Griffith received her degree in June 2017.

Career 
Along with four other women, Griffith founded the band Janes Plane in 1981, after which she became the band's lead singer and lyricist. The group played its first gig at an International Women's Day celebration in 1982.  Janes Plane achieved some local notoriety and performed in several North England cities and on national TV.

Griffith attempted her first fiction after the group disbanded. In 1983, she wrote a diary entry detailing her dreams of becoming a "best-seller" as she wrote her first (unpublished) novel, Greenstorm. The following year, she received rejections of her manuscript from two publishers. Elements later to appear in Ammonite arose in a second unpublished novel, We Are Paradise. 

Throughout the 80s and early 90s, Griffith worked as "an alcohol and drugs counsellor and case worker...; a hotline counsellor; a bouncer at a club; a tree technician and fence builder; a waitress; [and] labourer at an archaeological dig."

By late 1987 Griffith, made her first professional fiction sale: "Mirrors and Burnstone" to Interzone. Her debut novel, Ammonite, received several offers from publishers, including St. Martin's Press, Avon Press, and Del Rey Books. Griffith has since published eight full-length novels, a memoir, and numerous short stories and novellas.

In 2015, Griffith "founded the Literary Prize Data working group whose purpose initially was to assemble data on literary prizes in order to get a picture of how gender bias operates within the trade publishing ecosystem."

The following year, "she began #CripLit, an online community for disabled writers."

Awards and honors

Publications

Fiction 
 Ammonite, Del Rey,  (1992)
 Slow River, Ballantine Books,  (1995)
 Hild, Picador,  (2013)
 So Lucky, MCD x FSG Originals,  (2018)
 Spear, Tordotcom, ISBN 9781250819321 (2022)

Aud Torvingen series 

The Blue Place, William Morrow,  (1998)
 Stay, Black Lizard,  (2002)
 Always, Riverhead Books,  (2007)

Nonfiction 

 And Now We Are Going to Have a Party: Liner Notes to a Writer's Early Life, Payseur & Schmidt  (2007)

Anthologies 
 Bending the Landscape: Fantasy, Overlook Books,  (1997, with Stephen Pagel)
 Bending the Landscape: Science Fiction, Overlook Books,  (1998, with Stephen Pagel)
 Bending the Landscape: Horror, Overlook Books,  (2001, with Stephen Pagel)

Short fiction 
 An Other Winter's Tale (1987)
 Mirrors and Burnstone (1988)
 The Other (1989)
 We Have Met the Alien (1990)
 The Voyage South (1990)
 Down the Path of the Sun (1990)
 Song of Bullfrogs, Cry of Geese (1991)
 Wearing My Skin (1991)
 Touching Fire (1993)
 Yaguara (1994)
 A Troll Story (2000)
 With Her Body, Aqueduct Press (2004, a collection containing Touching Fire, Songs of Bullfrogs, Cry of Geese, and Yaguara)
 It Takes Two (2009)
 Cold Wind, Tor Books,  (2014)

Critical studies and reviews of Griffith's work
 Review of Hild.

References

External links 
 Official website
 
 The story behind Hild – Online essay by Nicola Griffith : Freed by Constraint at Upcoming4.me
30 years ago : a love story in photos by Nicola Griffith, 2018

1960 births
Michigan State University alumni
20th-century English novelists
21st-century English novelists
English science fiction writers
English short story writers
English crime fiction writers
English women novelists
Living people
Nebula Award winners
Women science fiction and fantasy writers
Lambda Literary Award winners
English lesbian writers
British historical novelists
American LGBT novelists
20th-century American novelists
21st-century American novelists
American women short story writers
American short story writers
American women novelists
Women crime fiction writers
Lesbian memoirists
20th-century American women writers
21st-century American women writers
20th-century English women
20th-century English people
21st-century English women
American lesbian writers
English LGBT novelists
Alumni of Anglia Ruskin University